Lake Mary Township is a township in Douglas County, Minnesota, United States. The population was 997 at the 2000 census.

History
Lake Mary Township was organized in 1867, and took its name from the Lake Mary within its borders.

Geography

Demographics
As of the census of 2000, there were 997 people, 362 households, and 309 families residing in the township. There were 491 housing units at an average density of 17.1/sq mi (6.6/km2). The racial makeup of the township was 99.80% White, 0.10% Native American and 0.10% Asian. Hispanic or Latino of any race were 0.20% of the population.

There were 362 households, out of which 36.7% had children under the age of 18 living with them, 79.6% were married couples living together, 3.0% had a female householder with no husband present, and 14.6% were non-families. 11.3% of all households were made up of individuals, and 6.1% had someone living alone who was 65 years of age or older. The average household size was 2.75 and the average family size was 2.98.

In the township the population was spread out, with 27.3% under the age of 18, 5.3% from 18 to 24, 26.0% from 25 to 44, 27.4% from 45 to 64, and 14.0% who were 65 years of age or older. The median age was 39 years. For every 100 females, there were 110.8 males. For every 100 females age 18 and over, there were 105.4 males.

The median income for a household in the township was $45,515, and the median income for a family was $47,500. Males had a median income of $34,044 versus $22,163 for females. The per capita income for the township was $19,621.  About 3.5% of families and 3.4% of the population were below the poverty line, including 2.5% of those under age 18 and 9.0% of those age 65 or over.

References

Townships in Douglas County, Minnesota
Townships in Minnesota